Indian Creek Settlement is an unincorporated community in Knox County, Indiana, in the United States.

The community took its name from Indian Creek.

References

Unincorporated communities in Knox County, Indiana
Unincorporated communities in Indiana